V636 Scorpii is a multiple star system in the constellation Scorpius, 3,000 light years away.  The primary is a Classical Cepheid (δ Cephei) variable and its visual magnitude varies from 6.4 to 6.9.

V636 Scorpii is a spectroscopic binary, and the fainter companion is thought to itself consist of two stars.  The primary is a luminous yellow star and a δ Cephei variable.  The less massive companion orbits every 3.6 years and is apparently a B9.5 main sequence star, but the dynamics of the system suggest that it may actually be a pair of stars is a close orbit.

The Cepheid primary pulsates regularly with a period of 6.79671 days.  It is a yellow-white supergiant or bright giant that is 5.6 times as massive as the Sun and 2,500 times as luminous.

References

Classical Cepheid variables
Scorpius (constellation)
F-type supergiants
156979
Scorpii, V636
085035
B-type main-sequence stars
F-type bright giants
Durchmusterung objects
Triple star systems